The 13th Pan American Games were held in Havana, Cuba from August 2 to August 18, 1991.

Medals

Gold

Men's 4.000m Points Race (Track): Erminio Suárez

Men's Featherweight (– 65 kg): Francisco Morales

Men's Team Competition: Diego Allona, Alejandro Doherty, Fernando Ferrara, Marcelo Garraffo, Carlos Geneyro, Pablo Lombi, Adrián Mandarano, Gabriel Minadeo, Pablo Moreira, Edgardo Pailos, Rodolfo Pérez, Carlos Retegui, Emanuel Roggero, Daniel Ruiz, Alejandro Siri, and Martín Sordelli
Women's Team Competition: Valeria Almada, Verónica Artica, Marcela Budnik, Victoria Carbó, María Castelli, María Paz Ferrari, Anabel Gambero, Gabriela Liz, Marisa López, Sofía MacKenzie, Karina Masotta, Laura Mulhall, Vanina Oneto, María Gabriela Pazos, Marcela Richezza, and Jorgelina Rimoldi

Men's Team Competition: Diego Allende, Alfredo Bridge, Gabriel Cairo, Osvaldo Gonella, Pablo Cairo, Guillermo Herrmann, Jorge Luz, José Posito, and Roberto Roldán
Women's 300 metres: María Eva Richardson
Women's 1500 metres: María Eva Richardson
Women's 3000 metres: Rosana Sastre
Women's 10,000 metres: Rosana Sastre
Women's 5000 metres: Claudia Rodríguez
Women's Team Relay 5000 m: Claudia Rodríguez, Rosana Sastre, and María Eva Richardson

Silver

Men's Heavyweight (+ 95 kg): Orlando Baccino 
Women's Middleweight (– 66 kg): Laura Martinel

Men's K2 1.000 metres: Mauricio Vergauven and José Luis Marello

Women's Foil: Sandra Giancola

Men's 1500 metres: Guillermo Herrero
Men's 20 kilometres: Guillermo Trinaroli
Men's Team Relay 10 km: Guillermo McCargo, Guillermo Herrero, and Guillermo Trinaroli
Women's 5000 metres: Rosana Sastre
Women's 10,000 metres: Claudia Rodríguez

Men's Single Sculls: Sergio Fernández
Men's Coxed Pairs: Marcelo Pieretti, Gustavo Pacheco, and Andrés Seperizza
Men's Lightweight Double Sculls: Federico Querin and Jorge Lammo

Men's 25 m Standard Pistol Teams: Oscar Yuston, Jorge Almiron, and Daniel Felizia

Men's Lechner A390: Carlos Espínola

Men's Freestyle (– 68 kg): Daniel Navarrete

Bronze

Men's 5,000 metres: Antonio Silio

Men's Super Heavyweight (+ 91 kg): Elio Ibarra

Men's 1.000m Time Trial (Track): Germán García
Men's 4.000m Team Pursuit (Track): Argentina

Men's Light Middleweight (– 78 kg): Dario García 
Men's Light Heavyweight (– 95 kg): Jorge Aguirre 
Men's Open Class: Orlando Baccino 
Women's Half Lightweight (– 52 kg): Carolina Mariani

Women's All-Around: Romina Plataroti

Women's Lechner A390: María Espínola
Men's Laser: José Campero

Men's Team Competition: Argentina men's national volleyball team

Results by event

Basketball

Men's Team Competition
Preliminary Round (Group A)
Lost to Bahamas (96-104)
Lost to United States (81-87)
Defeated Cuba (77-72)
Defeated Venezuela (100-85)
Quarterfinals
Lost to Mexico (77-91)
Classification Matches
5th/8th place: Lost to Brazil (64-95)
7th/8th place: Defeated Uruguay (71-63) → Seventh place
Team Roster

Women's Team Competition
Preliminary Round Robin
Lost to Cuba (47-93)
Lost to United States (40-97)
Lost to Canada (61-81)
Lost to Brazil (56-83) → Fifth place
Team Roster

Volleyball

Men's Team Competition
Preliminary Round
Lost to Brazil (1-3)
Defeated Puerto Rico (3-0)
Lost to Cuba (0-3)
Defeated Canada (3-1)
Lost to United States (2-3)
Semifinals
Lost to Cuba (0-3)
Bronze Medal Match
Defeated United States (3-1) → Bronze Medal
Team Roster

See also
 Argentina at the 1992 Summer Olympics

References
Argentine Olympic Committee

Nations at the 1991 Pan American Games
P
1991